Phrynobatrachus kinangopensis is a species of frog in the family Phrynobatrachidae. It is endemic to the Kenyan Highlands east of the Great Rift Valley. Both the scientific name and its common names, Kinangop river frog and Kinangop puddle frog, refer to its type locality, Mount Kinangop.

Description
In addition to the sexual dimorphism ins size, mature males differ from females by having small, white asperities on the posterior half of the body and a speckled throat. The feet are moderately to extensively webbed. There is a dark band running from the nostrils to the tympanum, sometimes border by a silvery streak.

Distribution

Habitat and conservation
Phrynobatrachus kinangopensis occurs in montane grasslands and forests and is associated with rain-filled temporary pools, its presumed breeding habitat.

Phrynobatrachus kinangopensis is a rare species, although this impression might also be caused by surveys conducted at a wrong time of the year. Nevertheless, intensive subsistence agriculture is causing habitat deterioration and loss outside the national parks—the species occurs in both the Aberdare and Mount Kenya National Parks. Agro-chemicals might also be an issue. The International Union for Conservation of Nature (IUCN) considers it "Vulnerable".

References

kinangopensis
Frogs of Africa
Amphibians of Kenya
Endemic fauna of Kenya
Taxa named by Fernand Angel
Amphibians described in 1924
Taxonomy articles created by Polbot